is the sixth album of Japanese rock band, Granrodeo. It was released on 24 September 2014.

Song Information 
 "DARK SHAME" was used as the opening theme to the 2012 anime television series Code:Breaker.
 "Henai no Rondo" was used as the opening theme to the 2013 anime television series Karneval.
 "The Other self" was used as the 1st opening theme to the 2013 anime television series "Kuroko's Basketball 2".
 "Hengenjizai no Magical Star" was used as the 2nd opening theme to the 2013 anime television series "Kuroko's Basketball 2".
 "Sakura-iro dai 2 Button" was added as an insert song for the single "Henai no Rondo".
 "baby bad boy" was added as an insert song for the single "The Other self".
 "DAWN GATE" was added as an insert song for the single "The Other self".
 "Zetchou Poison" was added as an insert song for the single "Hengenjizai no Magical Star".

Track listing

Personnel 
 Kishow: vocals, lyrics
 E-Zuka: lead guitar, backing vocals, Arranging

Cover 
"The Other self" and "Henai no Rondo" were covered by Breakerz and Takanori Nishikawa respectively, on the 2020 Granrodeo tribute album Rodeo Freak.

Charts

References
Official mobile site

2014 albums
Granrodeo albums